Sean Michael Murray (born 11 October 1993) is a professional association footballer who plays as a midfielder for NIFL Premiership club Glentoran.

He progressed through the academy at Watford from the age of nine, and broke into the first-team in April 2011. He went on to make 85 first-team appearances for the club before being loaned to Wigan Athletic early in the 2015–16 season. He left Watford at the end of the season to join Swindon Town and then joined Colchester United in January 2017. He left Colchester in summer 2018 and joined Danish Superliga side Vejle Boldklub. In February 2019 he left Vejle Boldklub to sign for Irish side Dundalk.

Murray has represented the Republic of Ireland at under-17, under-19 and under-21 levels.

Club career

Watford
Born in Abbots Langley, Hertfordshire, Murray joined Watford's youth system in 2002, aged nine. Beginning in 2007, he studied at Harefield Academy as part of the initial intake where Watford's youth players are developed. Despite interest from Manchester City, Murray signed his first professional contract with Watford in July 2010, although due to Football Association regulations, it did not take effect until his 17th-birthday. He made his debut for the Hornets as a substitute in a Championship game against Queens Park Rangers at Vicarage Road on 30 April 2011, a 2–0 defeat for Watford.

On the fringes of the first-team under new manager Sean Dyche, Murray had made just one late substitute appearance in the first half of the 2011–12 season before he was a surprise inclusion in the starting line-up for Watford's FA Cup third round tie with Tottenham Hotspur on 27 January 2012. He came close to scoring in the game, hitting the post in the second-half before being substituted as his side fell to a 1–0 defeat. Murray retained his place in the team, and scored his first professional goal three weeks later, with a deflected free kick in a 3–2 victory for Watford against Leicester City. Murray continued to play regularly for the rest of the season; his good form, scoring four goals in seven games, led to him winning the Football League Young Player of the Month award for March. He won Watford's Young Player of the Season award at the End of Season Awards Dinner for his great form since his introduction to the first team, after scoring sevens goals in 19 appearances.

In August 2012, Murray signed a five-year deal with Watford, but following the Pozzo family takeover of Watford and an influx of new players, Murray was restricted to playing 16 games and scoring one goal during the 2012–13 season.

He marked his return to the first-team on 6 August 2013 with two goals in Watford's 3–1 League Cup victory against Bristol Rovers, and he went on to make 39 appearances and score a total of six goals across the campaign.

Murray was restricted to making just nine first-team appearances during the 2014–15 season, making what was to be his last appearance for the club against Chelsea in a 3–0 FA Cup third round defeat on 4 January 2015.

Wigan Athletic loan
On 5 August 2015, Murray moved to League One side Wigan Athletic in an initial one-month loan deal, later extended until January 2016. He made his debut as a substitute during Wigan's 2–0 defeat at Coventry City on 8 August.

Murray scored his first and only goal for Wigan against Blackpool in a 4–0 victory in the Football League Trophy on 10 November, before his loan was terminated on 16 December. He had made eight appearances for Wigan.

Swindon Town
League One club Swindon Town signed Murray on a free transfer on 31 August 2016 on a one-year deal, with the option of a further year. He made his club debut on 3 September as a substitute in Swindon's 2–2 League One draw at Peterborough United.

Murray scored his first and Swindon's only goal in their 3–1 home defeat by Northampton Town on 27 September. After 23 games for Town, Murray had his contract terminated by the club on 31 January 2017, having fallen out of favour under new director of football Tim Sherwood.

Colchester United
Immediately following his release from Swindon Town, Murray signed a one-and-a-half year contract with League Two club Colchester United on 31 January 2017. Murray made his debut as a replacement for Craig Slater in the 65th minute of Colchester's 1–1 draw at Blackpool on 4 February. He was sent off for the first time in his career for a bad challenge on Blackpool's Jim McAlister in the fifth minute of injury time. He ended the season with 16 League Two appearances to his name.

Murray scored his first Colchester goal on 30 September 2017 in their 1–0 win at Yeovil Town. He required an operation on his knee in October 2017 which would rule him out of action for up to six weeks. He completed the season with 40 appearances and three goals.

On 29 June 2018, Colchester manager John McGreal announced that Murray had left the club after failing to agree a new deal.

Vejle Boldklub
On 26 July 2018, Danish Superliga side Vejle Boldklub announced the signing of Murray on a three-year contract. On 5 February 2019 Vejle announced, that they had mutually terminated the contract of the player.

Dundalk
On the same day as Murray left Vejle Boldklub, he signed a long-term contract with Dundalk. In his first season at the club, he scored three goals in 25 league appearances to help win the Premier Division title and League Cup. In the 2020 Europa league third Qualifying round, He scored Dundalk's equalizing goal against Sheriff Tiraspol and eventually won the penalty shootout. He scored the opening goal against KÍ in the 2020 Europa league play-offs helping Dundalk qualify for the 2020–21 UEFA Europa League group stage and scored again in the opening game against Molde FK.

International career
Although born in England, Murray qualifies to play for the Republic of Ireland through his Irish grandparents. Murray twice represented the Republic of Ireland at under-17 level in UEFA competitions, making his debut against Finland on 21 March 2010 in a 1–0 win.

Murray made his debut at under-19 level on 24 May 2011 in the Ireland's 1–0 win against Poland. He scored his first goal for the side in a 3–0 win against Italy on 29 May 2011, and went on to make twelve appearances for the side in UEFA competitions.

Murray scored on his under-21 debut on 10 September 2012 in a 4–2 away win against Italy. In total, he earned nine caps for the under-21 side.

Career statistics

Honours
Individual
2016 Watford Young Player of the Year
March 2012 Football League Young Player of the Month
October 2020 SSE Airtricity SWAI Player of the Month Award .

Dundalk
League of Ireland Premier Division: 2019
FAI Cup: 2020
League of Ireland Cup: 2019
President of Ireland's Cup: 2019, 2021
Champions Cup: 2019

References

External links

1993 births
Living people
People from Abbots Langley
English footballers
Republic of Ireland association footballers
Republic of Ireland youth international footballers
Republic of Ireland under-21 international footballers
Association football midfielders
Watford F.C. players
Wigan Athletic F.C. players
Swindon Town F.C. players
Colchester United F.C. players
Vejle Boldklub players
Dundalk F.C. players
Glentoran F.C. players
Danish Superliga players
English Football League players
Republic of Ireland expatriate association footballers
Irish expatriate sportspeople in Denmark
English expatriate sportspeople in Denmark
English expatriate footballers
Expatriate footballers in Denmark
Footballers from Hertfordshire
English people of Irish descent
Citizens of Ireland through descent